The International Geothermal Association (IGA) is an international non-profit, non-political, non-governmental association representing the geothermal power sector worldwide. The organisation works for the promotion and worldwide deployment of geothermal energy technology and advocates a future energy system based on renewable energy. The IGA has consultative status to the UN and special observer status to the Green Climate Fund.

As of 2016, the IGA has more than 5,000 members in over 65 countries.

History 
The International Geothermal Association was founded on 6 July 1988 in Auckland, New Zealand, as a non-profit organization to encourage research, development and utilization of geothermal resources worldwide. The first idea to create a structured group of organizations and experts involved in development and promotion of geothermal energy dates back to the late sixties. Preliminary discussions about the establishment of an international geothermal association took place during the Symposium on Geothermal Energy, which was held in Pisa, Italy, in September 1970, initiated by UN-DTCD (United Nations Department of Technical Cooperation for Development) and organized by ENEL and CNR. However, the time for this idea has not yet come and it was discussed further, as for example during the World Geothermal Congress in San Francisco in 1975 or during the International Geothermal Workshop in Ecuador in 1978.
In 1986 there was a special study dedicated to the institutional aspects of a possible international geothermal association. After consulting experts from different countries, various international institutions and five international geothermal schools operating at that time the study was completed. It has concluded that an international geothermal community is ready to set up a unique and autonomous geothermal organization.
The first foundation meeting took place in Castelnuovo V.C., Italy, 2–5 May 1989.

Aims 
The IGA aims to encourage research, the development and utilization of geothermal resources worldwide through the publication of scientific and technical information among the geothermal specialists, the business community, governmental representatives, UN organisations, civil society and the general public.

Structure
The International Geothermal Association consists of its members, its board of directors, officers, permanent committees and secretariat. Committees, regional branches and affiliated organizations may vary from time to time.

Membership 
There are different membership categories:
 Individual members: scientists, technologists and other persons engaged in the research, development or utilization of geothermal energy.
 Corporate members:  industrial, scientific or cultural organizations which are established on a commercial or profit-making basis, are interested in geothermal energy and support the objectives of the Association.
 Student members:  students with an interest in geothermal energy who are regularly enrolled in a college or university.
 Affiliated members: persons belonging to the Association through a group scheme by virtue of their membership in an Affiliated Organization.
 Institutional members:  international, national, regional or local, non-profit organizations entrusted with promotion, planning, supervision, co-ordination or performance of geothermal activities and which support the objectives of the Association.
 Sustaining members: organizations or persons who wish to demonstrate their interest in geothermal energy by making a voluntary contribution to the Association above a minimum level.
 Honorary members:  senior Individual Members who have given many years of service to the Association and/or have made significant contribution in the field of geothermal energy.

See also 

List of notable renewable energy organizations

References

External links

International renewable energy organizations